Drago Pašalić (born June 23, 1984) is a Croatian former professional basketball player. He is the current technical director of Donar. In the beginning of his career he played for the Croatian national team. He is a one-time Croatian League and two-time Dutch League champion.

Professional career
His first five years as a pro, Pašalić played with his hometown team, Split. In the 2002–03 season, he won the Croatian Championship with the club.

He was an early entry candidate in the 2004 NBA draft but withdrew and became one again in 2005 but was not selected. On June 29, 2016, he signed with Donar Groningen of the Dutch Basketball League. After the 2016–17 DBL regular season, he was named to the All-DBL Team. In April 2017, Pašalić extended his contract with two more years. His contract was not renewed after the 2018–19 season. Pašalić won two DBL championships with Donar.

On August 14, 2019, he has signed with ZZ Leiden of the Dutch Basketball League.  After the 2019–20 season was cancelled due to the coronavirus outbreak in March 2020, Pašalić retired.

Executive career
In July 2021, Pašalić became the head of technical business of Heroes Den Bosch's youth academy. On March 15, 2022, Pašalić signed with Donar to become its full-time technical director starting from the 2022–23 season.

Personal
Pašalić is married to a wife from the Netherlands. They have three children; two daughters, Kiara and Kinge, and a son, Ivan Pašalić. His off-season place of residence is Breda, the Netherlands.

On September 30, 2020, it was announced Pašalić had suffered a cardiac arrest.

Career statistics

EuroLeague

|-
| style="text-align:left;"| 2010–11
| style="text-align:left;"  | Cibona
| 7 || 6 || 23.4 || .525 || .235 || .833 || 4.7 || 0.4 || 0 || 0.6 || 9.1 || 5.6
|-class="sortbottom"
| colspan=2 align=center | Career ||  7 || 6 || 23.4 || .525 || .235 || .833 || 4.7 || 0.4 || 0 || 0.6 || 9.1 || 5.6
|-

Honours and titles

Club
Split
 Croatian League: 2002–03
 Croatian Cup: 2004

Donar
 Dutch Basketball League: 2016–17, 2017–18
 NBB Cup: 2016–17, 2017–18
 Dutch Supercup: 2016

Individual
 All-DBL Team: 2016–17

References

External links

Draft Express profile
Eurobasket.com profile
FIBA.com profile
ABA League profile
TBLStat.net profile

1984 births
Living people
ABA League players
B.S. Leiden players
BC Azovmash players
Bilbao Basket players
Centers (basketball)
Competitors at the 2009 Mediterranean Games
Croatian men's basketball players
Donar (basketball club) players
Dutch Basketball League players
Hapoel Gilboa Galil Elyon players
HKK Široki players
KK Cibona players
KK Split players
KK Zadar players
Liga ACB players
Mediterranean Games gold medalists for Croatia
Mediterranean Games medalists in basketball
Obradoiro CAB players
P.A.O.K. BC players
Power forwards (basketball)
Türk Telekom B.K. players
Ülker G.S.K. basketball players
ZZ Leiden players